"When You Say You Love Me" may refer to:

"When You Say You Love Me", a song by Josh Groban from Closer
"When You Say You Love Me" (Human Nature song), 2004